A list of films produced in the Soviet Union between 1970 and 1979:

1970s
Soviet films of 1970
Soviet films of 1971
Soviet films of 1972
Soviet films of 1973
Soviet films of 1974
Soviet films of 1975
Soviet films of 1976
Soviet films of 1977
Soviet films of 1978
Soviet films of 1979

Soviet
Films